Johann Gottfried Köhler (15 December 1745 – 19 September 1801) was a German astronomer who discovered a number of nebulae, star clusters, and galaxies.

Köhler is best remembered for his discovery of Open Cluster M67, Elliptical Galaxy M59, and Elliptical Galaxy M60. The latter two were discovered on the same day, 11 April 1779.

He worked with the noted astronomer Johann Elert Bode, who refined and published Köhler's proposal for the symbol of Uranus.

From 1784 he was the director of Mathematisch-Physikalischer Salon.

References

1745 births
1801 deaths
18th-century German astronomers
Scientists from Dresden